Depew (also De Pew, Heckleburney) is an unincorporated community in Shelby County, Ohio, United States.

Notes

Unincorporated communities in Shelby County, Ohio
Unincorporated communities in Ohio